The Diocese of Sorres or Diocese of Sorra (Latin: Dioecesis Sorrensis) was a Roman Catholic diocese located in the village of Borutta in the province of Sassari, northern Sardinia, Italy. Erected in the 11th century, it was suppressed in 1503 to the Archdiocese of Sassari. Its cathedral was San Pietro di Sorres.

Ordinaries
Francesco (1348 Appointed - )
Giacomo de Podio (1461-1497 Died)

References

Former Roman Catholic dioceses in Italy